Racing Point F1 Team, which competed as BWT Racing Point F1 Team and commonly known as Racing Point, was a British motor racing team and constructor that Racing Point UK entered into the Formula One World Championship. The team was based in Silverstone, England and competed under a British licence.

The team was renamed in February 2019 from Racing Point Force India F1 Team, which used the constructor name of Force India for the latter half of the 2018 season. Racing Point made their racing debut at the 2019 Australian Grand Prix. The team's drivers for the 2020 season were Sergio Pérez and Lance Stroll. The team rebranded to Aston Martin for the 2021 Formula One season.

Origins 
Jordan saw moderate success in the late 1990s and early 2000s, particularly in  when the team achieved two race victories and finished 3rd in the World Constructors' Championship. A decline in performance followed, culminating in the team being sold to the Midland Group in 2005 and being renamed Midland F1 Racing for the  season. The team remained unsuccessful, failing to score any points. After another season with little improvement, albeit with the team scoring its first point in over two years at the 2007 Japanese Grand Prix, the team was sold to Indian businessman Vijay Mallya.

The Silverstone-based team was renamed Force India for the  season, its fourth identity in as many years. During the  season, the team was put into administration as a result of financial and legal troubles encountered by team owner Mallya. Force India's assets were purchased by Racing Point UK, a consortium led by Canadian businessman Lawrence Stroll. However, the team's Formula One entry was not transferable, marking the official end of the entry originating in 1991. The team was renamed Racing Point Force India for the remainder of the 2018 season before becoming Racing Point for the 2019 season.

Racing history

2019 season 

Racing Point confirmed in November 2018 that Lance Stroll and Sergio Pérez would be the two drivers for the 2019 season. The 2019 season also saw the team branded as "SportPesa Racing Point F1 Team", acknowledging lead sponsor SportPesa, a sports betting company based in Kenya. The team's car for the 2019 season, the Racing Point RP19, was announced in Toronto, Canada. The team scored points at each of the first four races of the season, including a double points finish in Azerbaijan as Pérez and Stroll finished 6th and 9th respectively. Despite this early success, Racing Point went on to struggle during the middle part of the season, with Stroll's 9th place in Canada being the team's only points finish in the following six races. Their best result of the season came at the German Grand Prix, where Stroll briefly led the race as a result of tyre strategy in the wet weather before eventually finishing 4th.

Racing Point's fortunes improved in the second half of the season after the team brought significant upgrades ahead of the Belgian Grand Prix. Over the next nine races, Pérez scored points in all but one—retiring from the Singapore Grand Prix with an oil leak. This points streak brought Racing Point ahead of Alfa Romeo in the standings, finishing the season in 7th place with 73 points.

2020 season

SportPesa ended their title sponsorship arrangement with Racing Point, with Austrian water technology company BWT becoming the team's new title sponsor. During pre-season testing Racing Point's car, the RP20 caused controversy due to its resemblance to the Mercedes AMG F1 W10 EQ Power+, which won the 2019 Formula One World Championship. Following the  a formal protest was launched against the RP20 specifically surrounding the brake ducts which the rules dictate must be designed by the team. Officials have impounded the brake ducts from both the RP20 and the W10 to investigate the protest. Nico Hülkenberg served as a substitute driver for both events. Between the British and 70th Anniversary Grands Prix, Racing Point was fined €400,000 and had 15 constructors points deducted after the protest lodged by Renault F1 Team was upheld.

At the Italian Grand Prix, Stroll finished third and took the team's first ever podium. At the Eifel Grand Prix, Lance Stroll was unable to participate in qualifying and the race due to having tested positive for coronavirus. Hülkenberg would serve as his substitute for the next two sessions, finishing 8th after starting 20th.

At the Turkish Grand Prix, Stroll achieved the team's first ever pole position, with teammate Pérez qualifying third. In the race, Stroll led early into the race but eventually dropped to ninth, while Pérez achieved second place, taking the team's second podium finish. Pérez came close to taking the team's third podium finish in the Bahrain Grand Prix, but a late engine failure in lap 54 forced him to retire. Earlier in the race, Stroll's car was flipped upside down due to a collision with Daniil Kvyat, which meant Bahrain was the first race in which both cars did not score a point in the 2020 season. At the Sakhir Grand Prix, Pérez gave Racing Point their first win as a constructor and as a legal entity while Stroll also finished on the podium with his 3rd-place finish. This was the first time any incarnation of the team had won a race since Jordan won the 2003 Brazilian Grand Prix. It was the fifth Grand Prix victory for any incarnation of the team.

After Lawrence Stroll bought a 16.7% stake in Aston Martin, the team rebranded to Aston Martin F1 Team.

Complete Formula One results 
(key)

Notes
 † – The driver did not finish the Grand Prix, but was classified as he completed over 90% of the race distance.

Notes

References

External links 

 

 
Formula One entrants
British auto racing teams
British racecar constructors
2019 establishments in England
Auto racing teams established in 2019